List of people from Greenwich :
Astronomer Royal Sir George Airy, lived at the White House, Crooms Hill
Boy George lead singer of Culture Club, born in Eltham, Greenwich
Canon Richard Rhodes Bristow, born in Greenwich
Writer Jocelyn Brooke, lived at 13 Eliot Place, Blackheath.
Philip Dormer Stanhope, 4th Earl of Chesterfield, statesman and man of letters, lived at the Ranger's House, Chesterfield Walk, Greenwich.
Composer and conductor Christopher D. Cook, born and raised in Charlton
Actor Dominic Cooper, born in Greenwich
 Jim Davidson, comedian and actor was born in Kidbrooke
Actor and comedian Simon Day, born in Blackheath
Engineer Alexander Duckham, founder of the Duckhams oil company, was born in Blackheath, living in Dartmouth Grove and in Vanbrugh Castle, east Greenwich. His brother Arthur Duckham, founder of the Institution of Chemical Engineers, was also born and raised in Blackheath.
Footballer Syd Ellis, 19312001 (full back)
Novelist and professor of English Bernadine Evaristo was born in Eltham and attended Eltham Hill Grammar School for Girls
Journalist and radio presenter Nick Ferrari has lived in Blackheath since 1985
 Actress, singer, Lotti Fraser, 1989
David Frost, Baron Frost, diplomat, civil servant and politician
Christopher Gabbitas, baritone with The King's Singers A cappella group, currently lives in Greenwich
Barrister Mark Watson-Gandy lives in Blackheath
Evening Standard journalist Andrew Gilligan, currently lives in Greenwich
James Glaisher FRS (1809–1903), pioneer meteorologist and balloon aeronaut, lived for 34 years at 20 Dartmouth Hill, Blackheath
Malcolm Hardee (1950–2005), comedian, author, club proprietor, agent, manager and former "Father of British alternative comedy" spent most of his life in Greenwich and ran his two most famous clubs there – The Tunnel (near Blackwall Tunnel) and Up The Creek, which still exists in Creek Road
Blake Harrison, actor most famous for his role as "Neil" in The Inbetweeners born in Greenwich
Musician Jools Holland, lives in Greenwich and at Cooling Castle, Kent
Jazz and blues, guitarist Billy Jenkins ran Wood Wharf rehearsal studios, situated to the west of the Cutty Sark, during the 1980s
Glen Johnson, footballer who plays for England and Stoke City, was born in Greenwich, 23 August 1984
Dr Samuel Johnson, essayist, critic, poet, and lexicographer, lived in Greenwich Church Street when he first came to London in 1736.
Henry Kelsey (–1724), early explorer of Canada, was born and married in East Greenwich, and buried in St Alfege's Church.
Kwasi Kwarteng, politician
Guitarist Albert Lee, grew up in Blackheath, Greenwich
Comedian Dan Leno, rented accommodation at the Spreadeagle Tavern, Stockwell Street in 1902. 
Cricketer Charles Lewin, and Royal Navy rear admiral
Poet Cecil Day-Lewis, lived at 6 Crooms Hill
Actor Sir Daniel Day-Lewis, who has won three Academy Awards, two Golden Globes, four BAFTAs and three Screen Actors Guild Awards, grew up in Charlton, Greenwich
Professional footballer Barry Little (1964–1994), born in Greenwich. 
Interior designer and television presenter Laurence Llewelyn-Bowen, lived in Greenwich
Indie band Lucky Soul, based in Greenwich
Comic postcard artist Donald McGill, lived at 5 Bennett Park, Blackheath Village
Drummer Mitch Mitchell of The Jimi Hendrix Experience, born in Greenwich in 1946
Dr James Monro of Bethlem Hospital-fame, began his medical practice here in 1713
Gary Moore, footballer
Novelist Mary Anna Needell (née Lupton), was born at Vanbrugh Castle in 1830.
Mechanical engineer John Penn was born in Greenwich and his main works were situated in south Greenwich, close to the modern-day junction of Blackheath Road and Lewisham Road
Actress Vanessa Redgrave, born in Greenwich
Eric Gascoigne Robinson VC, naval commander and war hero, born in Greenwich
Wing Commander Jack Rose, RAF fighter pilot and colonial administrator, was born in Blackheath and attended Shooters Hill School.
Businessman Frank Searle, born in Greenwich in 1874
Victor Serebriakoff, International President of Mensa, lived at Blackheath
Francis Shand, cricketer
Actor Ben Small, lives in Greenwich
Artist Richard Spare, established his Wellington Studio in Charlton, Greenwich in the late 1980s
Renaissance composer, musician, and Gentleman of the Chapel Royal, Thomas Tallis, died in Greenwich on 23 November 1585
Architect Samuel Sanders Teulon, born in Greenwich
Artist Sir James Thornhill, said to have lived in Park Hall on Crooms Hill (originally designed for architect John James who never actually occupied the house)
Liz Truss, politician
Cricketer and British Army officer Arthur Tyler, born at Charlton in 1907
King Henry VIII (Tudor), was born in Greenwich on 28 June 1491.
Architect Sir John Vanbrugh, lived at 121 Maze Hill in a house of his own design, today known as Vanbrugh Castle, overlooking Greenwich Park
 Filmmaker John Walsh, born and still resides in Greenwich
Barrister Mark Watson-Gandy, currently lives in the Blackheath district of the Royal Borough of Greenwich
Benjamin Waugh, founder of the UK charity the National Society for the Prevention of Cruelty to Children, lived in Crooms Hill
Actor Colin Wells, born in Greenwich
Actor Ben Willbond lives in Greenwich
General James Wolfe, lived in Macartney House on Crooms Hill, and was buried in St Alfege's Church.
Sir Alfred Yarrow, shipbuilder, lived in Woodlands, Mycenae Road, north of Blackheath

References

Greenwich
People from the Royal Borough of Greenwich